The Progressive Conservatism Project is a research project initiated by the British think tank Demos to investigate the principles of progressive conservatism which is supported by prominent figures in the Conservative Party. British Prime Minister David Cameron attended the launch of the project in 2009 as Conservative Party leader. At the launch, Cameron outlined his vision of contemporary progressive conservatism:

References 

Conservative organisations in the United Kingdom
Progressive conservatism